The Wandiligong Maze, located in north-east Victoria, Australia, five minutes away from Bright, was "Australia's largest living hedge maze". The Wandiligong Maze has a licensed cafe as well as mini golf on the site. The maze was created in March 1990 with the planting of 850 Lambertiana cypress plants. The maze was often used as a location for weddings and special occasions. When the plants began dying and the restaurant changed owners, the maze was cut down in 2020.

References

Tourist attractions in Victoria (Australia)
Mazes